Sons of the North is the debut album by English rock band Black Spiders. It was released 7 February 2011 after two years of touring by the band.

Track listing
All songs written by Pete Spiby, Ozzy Lister, Mark Thomas, Si Atkinson and Adam Irwin.

 "Stay Down" – 3:03
 "KISS Tried to Kill Me" – 4:26
 "Just Like a Woman" – 3:40
 "Easy Peasy" – 3:23
 "Blood of the Kings" – 7:37
 "St. Peter" – 5:11
 "Man's Ruin" – 4:00
 "Medusa's Eyes" – 3:53
 "Si, El Diablo" – 3:59
 "What Good's a Rock Without a Roll?" – 4:29
 "Sons of the North (bonus track, iTunes) – 4:22

Personnel

Black Spiders
 Pete 'Spider' Spiby – lead vocals, rhythm guitar 
 Ozzy 'Owl' Lister – lead guitar, backing vocals
 Mark 'The Dark Shark' Thomas – lead guitar, backing vocals
 Adam 'The Fox' Irwin – bass guitar, backing vocals
 Si 'Tiger' Atkinson – drums, percussion

Additional musicians
 Danni Maibaum – additional female vocals on "Easy Peasy"

References

2011 debut albums
Black Spiders albums